Father Figure is a British television sitcom that was first broadcast on BBC One on 18 September 2013. In Ireland the series first aired on RTÉ Two in September 2013. The six-part series was written by Jason Byrne and directed by Nick Wood.

Cast
Jason Byrne as Tom Whyte
Karen Taylor as Elaine Whyte
Pauline McLynn as Mary Whyte
Dermot Crowley as Pat Whyte
Michael Smiley as Roddy
Matthew Fenton as Dylan Whyte
Alexander Aze as Drew Whyte
David Reed as Brendan
Margaret Cabourn-Smith as Helen
Tim Downie as Tim Curtain
Thom Collett as Quiet Joe

Production
In June 2013, filming began on the comedy series at Elstree Studios and ended on 11 July 2013. The studio scenes were filmed in front of a studio audience.

Episode list

Reception

Ratings
Overnight figures showed that the first episode was watched by 11.5% of the viewing audience of that time, with 1.37 million watching it. The second episode was watched by 12.3% of the viewing audience. The third episode was watched by 10.4% of the viewing audience.

Critical reception
The series received mostly negative reviews. Catherine Gee of The Daily Telegraph gave it one out of five stars and said: "All of it was implausible, but, that’s not really the point. We don’t need our comedy to be plausible. Peep Show was rarely plausible, neither was Blackadder, nor Red Dwarf, nor Fawlty Towers, but that didn’t stop them being funny. What we need is for these implausible situations to be delivered with wit, brilliant timing and a superbly funny script. Father Figure failed on every count." The Herald said: "Showing a silly, childish and almost entirely innocent sitcom like Father Figure (BBC One, Wednesday, 11.35pm) so late at night is weird. ... Father Figure is not bad. It's very not bad. In fact, if you're a fan of silent comedy, it's rather good. Indeed, much of the first episode is so reminiscent of silent comedy routines that Jason Byrne might have created a new genre: silent comedy with sound." The Daily Express commented: "It gives me great pleasure to announce that the BBC has broadcast a “sitcom” which is worse than Big Top. ... At the outset, I should confess that I did laugh, just once, after which I continued to watch in horror".

Metro also disliked the series, giving it two out of five stars and commented: "Father Figure managed to commit every sitcom cliché crime in the book: dopey bloke, interfering mother, long-suffering wife, victim neighbours, bonkers relatives." The Scotsman said: "The show is relentlessly middle-of-the-road, determinedly populist and wholly idiotic. Were it not for the sweary-words and a few double entendres, it would be pitched firmly as family entertainment and has clearly been commissioned to try to cash in on the unexpected success of Mrs Brown's Boys." The Irish Independent said: "This was unabashed slapstick stuff and none the worse for that, but Byrne, who created and scripted the show, had no other ideas up his sleeve and within minutes the action had degenerated into a succession of increasingly frantic pratfalls and custard-pie gags, each of them less amusing than the one that had gone before."

Home media
The series was released on DVD in the UK on 28 October 2013.

References

External links
 
 
 

2013 British television series debuts
2013 British television series endings
2010s British sitcoms
BBC television sitcoms
English-language television shows
Television series about dysfunctional families
Television shows set in Hertfordshire
Television shows shot at Elstree Film Studios